The Club de Rugby Pozuelo, also known as CRC Pozuelo, is a Spanish rugby union club sited in Pozuelo de Alarcón. The club currently competes in the División de Honor, the top division of Spanish rugby. The senior squad plays its matches at Campo de rugby Gabriel Parellada.

History
The club was born as the rugby department of Real Canoe Natación Club (one of the oldest swimming clubs of Spain) in 1963. One year after being established, the club won its first title, the Copa del Rey (then named "Copa del Generalísimo") after defeating Unión Deportiva Samboyana by 3-0 at Ruiz de Alda stadium.

After that achievement, Real Canoe played its first international competition, the Copa Ibérica de Rugby in 1965, becoming successor of defunct Real Madrid Rugby and Atlético Madrid. In 1967 Canoe won its second Copa Ibérica title.

In 2008, the Real Madrid C.F. made arrangements with Canoe to be represented in the División de Honor, reviving the rugby section of the club. When the agreement was about to be signed, president of Real Madrid Ramón Calderón, who had been the main architect of the return of rugby to the club, resigned from his role following allegations of vote-rigging for the confirmation for the financial budget. Real Madrid exploded into a crisis that suspended many projects and operations in the club, including the rugby section.

Canoe made a great campaign in the 2008–09 season, where the club won the División de Honor, Copa and Supercopa of Spain. Some of its most notable players were César Sempere, Javier Canosa, Juan Cano, Javier Salazar and Pablo Feijoo. In July 2010, CRC Pozuelo Madrid announced that the club would sell his place at División de Honor to meet the debts incurred by the business. As a result, the team played in the second division, "División de Honor B" in the 2010–11 and 2011–12 seasons. In March 2012 CRC Pozuelo promoted to the first division after winning the playoffs.

In 2012, Atlético de Madrid made a deal with CRC to have a rugby team in the División de Honor. The CRC squad agreed to use the name, shield and colors of Atlético Madrid during the time the agreement was in force.

In 2014 the team returned to competition under its name "CRC Pozuelo", after finishing the agreement with Atlético Madrid.

Club names
 Real Canoe Natación Club (1963–2000)
 UCM Canoe (2000–2001) – (Merger of Real Canoe & CD Universidad Complutense)
 Club de Rugby UCM (2001–2005) – (Merger of UCM Canoe & CR Liceo Francés, in 2003 Liceo Francés left the club)
 Club de Rugby CRC Pozuelo Madrid – (2005–) – (CD Universidad Complutense left the club)

Team names
 Real Canoe Natación Club (1963–1999)
 Complutense Canoe (1999–2000)
 UCM Canoe (2000–2001)
 UCM Madrid 2012 (2001–2002)
 UCM2M12 (2002–2004)
 Pozuelo UCM 2M12  (2004–2005)
 Madrid Noroeste (2005–2007)
 Bwin Pozuelo (2007–2008)
 CRC Madrid (2008–2011)
 Polideportivos & Fitness CRC (2011–2012)
 Rugby Atlético Madrid (2012–2014)
 CRC Pozuelo (2014–)

Season by season

36 seasons in División de Honor

Titles
División de Honor (5): 1971, 1972, 1973, 2000, 2009
Copa del Rey (10): 1964, 1966, 1970, 1971, 1974, 2001, 2002, 2003, 2008, 2009
Supercopa de España (2): 2008, 2009
Copa Ibérica (3): 1965, 1967, 2001

See also
 Real Madrid Rugby
 Atlético Madrid Rugby
 Real Canoe NC
 Rugby union in Spain

References

External links
CRC Madrid official website

Spanish rugby union teams
Sports teams in Madrid
Rugby clubs established in 1963
Sport in Pozuelo de Alarcón